The 1991 NCAA Division II women's basketball tournament was the tenth annual tournament hosted by the NCAA to determine the national champion of Division II women's  collegiate basketball in the United States.

North Dakota State defeated Southeast Missouri State in the championship game, 81–74, claiming the Bison's first NCAA Division II national title. 

The championship rounds were contested at the Show Me Center at Southeast Missouri State University in Cape Girardeau, Missouri.

Regionals

East - Johnstown, Pennsylvania
Location: Sports Center Host: University of Pittsburgh at Johnstown

South Atlantic - Norfolk, Virginia
Location: Joseph G. Echols Memorial Hall Host: Norfolk State University

West - Turlock, California
Location: Warrior Gym Host: California State University, Stanislaus

South Central - Cape Girardeau, Missouri
Location: Show Me Center Host: Southeast Missouri State University

North Central - Grand Forks, North Dakota
Location: Hyslop Sports Center Host: University of North Dakota

Great Lakes - Highland Heights, Kentucky
Location: Regents Hall Host: Northern Kentucky University

South - Jacksonville, Alabama
Location: Pete Mathews Coliseum Host: Jacksonville State University

New England - Waltham, Massachusetts
Location: Dana Center Host: Bentley College

National Finals - Cape Girardeau, Missouri
Final Four Location: Show Me Center Host: Southeast Missouri State University

All-tournament team
 Nadine Schmidt, North Dakota State
 Jill DeVries, North Dakota State
 Jerri Wiley, Southeast Missouri State
 Sarita Wesley, Southeast Missouri State
 Kim Penwell, Bentley

See also
 NCAA Women's Division II Basketball Championship
 1991 NCAA Division I women's basketball tournament
 1991 NCAA Division III women's basketball tournament
 1991 NCAA Division II men's basketball tournament

References
 1991 NCAA Division II women's basketball tournament jonfmorse.com

 
NCAA Division II women's basketball tournament
1991 in sports in Missouri